Cynthia Weil (born October 18, 1940) is an American songwriter who wrote many songs together with her husband Barry Mann.

Life and career
Weil was born in New York City, and was raised in a Conservative Jewish family.  Her father was Morris Weil, a furniture store owner and the son of Lithuanian-Jewish immigrants, and her mother was Dorothy Mendez, who grew up in a Sephardic Jewish family in Brooklyn.  Weil trained as an actress and dancer, but soon demonstrated a songwriting ability that led to her collaboration with Barry Mann, whom she married in August 1961. The couple has one daughter, Jenn Mann. Weil became one of the Brill Building songwriters of the 1960s, and one of the most important writers during the emergence of rock and roll.

She and her husband went on to create songs for many contemporary artists, winning several Grammy Awards as well as Academy Award nominations for their compositions for film. As their Rock and Roll Hall of Fame biography put it, in part: "Mann and Weil's... [works went from] epic ballads ('On Broadway', 'You've Lost That Lovin' Feelin'') to outright rockers ('Kicks', 'We Gotta Get Out of This Place') [and they also] placed an emphasis on meaningful lyrics in their songwriting. With Weil writing the words and Mann the music, they came up with a number of songs that addressed such serious subjects as racial and economic divides[,] 'Uptown', ...and the difficult reality of making it in the big city ('On Broadway'). 'Only in America'... tackled segregation and racism, making it rather too controversial for the Drifters, who were the intended artists. 'We Gotta Get out of This Place' became an anthem for [the] Vietnam soldier, antiwar protesters, and young people who viewed it as an anthem of greater opportunities."

In 1987, she was inducted with her husband, Mann, into the Songwriters Hall of Fame.  In 2004, Mann and Weil's They Wrote That?, a musical revue based on their songs, opened in New York. In it, Mann sang and Weil related stories about the songs and their personal history.

Weil, along with Mann; was named among the 2010 recipients of Ahmet Ertegun Award from the Rock and Roll Hall of Fame and was the first woman to receive the honor. At the ceremony at the Waldorf-Astoria, which was telecast on the Fuse TV cable network, songwriter Carole King inducted Mann and Weil and other songwriting colleagues from the 1950s and early 1960s, including Ellie Greenwich (posthumously) and Jeff Barry, Otis Blackwell (posthumously), Mort Shuman, and Jesse Stone (posthumously). "From the bottom of my heart and with the greatest humility," Ms. Weil said in her acceptance, "I thought you guys would never ask." Eric Burdon of the Animals and Ronnie Spector of the Ronettes performed at the ceremony. In 2011 Mann and Weil received the Johnny Mercer Award—the highest honor from the Songwriters Hall of Fame.

In 2015, Weil published her first novel, I'm Glad I Did, a mystery set in 1963.

Songs written by Barry Mann and Cynthia Weil

"A World of Our Own" – Closing theme song from the 1991 film Return to the Blue Lagoon – Surface
"Absolutely Green" – Dom DeLuise (co-written with Mann for the 1994 animated film A Troll in Central Park).
"Beyond the Last Island" – Adam Ryen (co-written with James Horner for the animated film Ten Apples Up on Top!).
"Black Butterfly" – Deniece Williams
"Blame It on the Bossa Nova" – Eydie Gormé
"Bless You" – Tony Orlando
"Christmas Vacation" – Title song for the 1989 film of the same name
"Don't Know Much" – Aaron Neville & Linda Ronstadt (also, earlier, Bill Medley and Bette Midler)
"He's Sure the Boy I Love" – The Crystals
"Heart" – Kenny Chandler
"Here You Come Again" – Dolly Parton
"Home of the Brave" - Bonnie and the Treasures, Jody Miller (also exists in an acetate demo by The Ronettes)
"How Can I Tell Her It's Over" – Andy Williams
"Hungry" – Paul Revere & the Raiders
"I Just Can't Help Believing" – B. J. Thomas, Elvis Presley
"I'm Gonna Be Strong" – Gene Pitney; covered by Cyndi Lauper
"I Will Come to You" – Hanson
"It's Not Easy" - Normie Rowe, The Will-O-Bees
"Just a Little Lovin' (Early in the Morning)" – Dusty Springfield, Carmen McRae, Barbra Streisand, Billy Eckstine, Bobby Vinton
"Just Once" – James Ingram with Quincy Jones
"Kicks" – Paul Revere & the Raiders
"Late at Night" – George Benson and Vicki Randle
"Let Me In" (Rick Derringer/Weil) – Rick Derringer
"Looking Through the Eyes of Love" – Gene Pitney, Marlena Shaw, The Partridge Family
"Love Doesn't Ask Why" – co-written with Phil Galdston. Recorded by Celine Dion.
"Love Her" – The Everly Bros, The Walker Bros.
"Love is Only Sleeping" – The Monkees
"Magic Town" – The Vogues
"Make Your Own Kind of Music" – "Mama" Cass Elliot
"Never Gonna Let You Go" – Sérgio Mendes and Dionne Warwick
"Nobody But You" – Gladys Knight and Ruby Turner
"None of Us Are Free" (Mann, Weil, Brenda Russell) – Ray Charles, Lynyrd Skynyrd, Solomon Burke
"On Broadway" – The Drifters, Eric Carmen, and later George Benson, Neil Young
"Only in America" – Jay and the Americans
"Remember" – Song from the 2004 film Troy – Covered by Josh Groban
"Running with the Night" (Lionel Richie, Weil) – Richie
"Saturday Night at The Movies" (The Drifters)
"Shades of Gray" – The Monkees
"Shape of Things to Come" – Max Frost and the Troopers
"Somewhere Out There" – Linda Ronstadt and James Ingram (written with James Horner for the 1986 animated film An American Tail) – a double Grammy Award winner.
"Sweet Survivor" - Peter, Paul, and Mary - written with Peter Yarrow; from the LP "Reunion", 1978.
"Uptown" – The Crystals, covered by Bette Midler
"Walking in the Rain" – The Ronettes Jay and  the Americans
"We Gotta Get out of This Place" – The Animals and covered by The Angels
"Where Have You Been (All My Life)" – Arthur Alexander, also played by Gene Vincent, Gerry and the Pacemakers, The Beatles recorded live December 31, 1962 at the Star Club, Hamburg, Germany; 
"(You're My) Soul and Inspiration" – The Righteous Brothers and later Donny & Marie Osmond
"You've Lost That Lovin' Feelin'" co-written with Phil Spector – The Righteous Brothers; later numerous other artists including Dionne Warwick, Hall & Oates, and a Roberta Flack-Donny Hathaway duet. , the Righteous Brothers' rendition was radio's most-played song of all time, with 14 million airplays to date.

Bibliography

References

External links
[ Cynthia Weil biography] at Allmusic website

1940 births
Living people
Musicians from New York City
People from Beverly Hills, California
Songwriters from New York (state)
Jewish American songwriters
20th-century Sephardi Jews
American Sephardic Jews
Grammy Award winners
Sephardi Conservative Jews
Songwriters from California
21st-century American Jews